Masineh (also Romanized as Masīneh and Mesīneh; also known as Masin and Māsīnī) is a village in Manzariyeh Rural District, in the Central District of Shahreza County, Isfahan Province, Iran. At the 2006 census, its population was 192, in 55 families.

References 

Populated places in Shahreza County